The  is a women's professional wrestling championship owned by the Tokyo Joshi Pro Wrestling (TJPW). The title was introduced on July 16, 2019, and the inaugural champion was crowned on August 25, 2019, when Natsumi Maki defeated Gisele Shaw.

, there have been a total of ten reigns shared between nine distinctive wrestlers and one vacancy. Rika Tatsumi is the current champion in her first reign.

Title history

Combined reigns 

References

External links 
TJPW official site, in Japanese

Women's professional wrestling championships
Tokyo Joshi Pro-Wrestling